1974 in philosophy

Events

 Last meeting of the London Positivist Society

Publications

Essays 
 Fodor, Jerry, T. Bever and M. Garrett, The Psychology of Language, McGraw Hill.
 Karttunen, Lauri, "Presupposition and Linguistic Context," Theoretical Linguistics, 1, pp. 181–194.  (Presented at the 1973 Winter Meeting of the Linguistic Society of America in San Diego)
 Montague, Richard, Formal Philosophy: Selected Papers of Richard Montague. ed. and introd. by Richmond H. Thomason. New Haven: Yale Univ. Press.
Thomas Nagel, "What Is it Like to Be a Bat?", The Philosophical Review
 Nozick, Robert, Anarchy, State, and Utopia
 Schleiermacher, Friedrich,  Hermeneutik. Nach den Handschriften. Ed. Heinz Kimmerle. Heidelberg: Carl Winter.
 Turner, Victor. Dramas, Fields, and Metaphors: Symbolic Action in Human Society
 Henri Lefebvre, The Production of Space (1974)

Philosophical fiction 
 Robert M. Pirsig, Zen and the Art of Motorcycle Maintenance (1974)

Births
Lisa Bortolotti
Rachel Cooper

Deaths
 Imre Lakatos of the London School of Economics suddenly died of a brain haemorrhage on February 2, aged 51. The Lakatos Award was set up by the school in his memory.

Philosophy
20th-century philosophy
Philosophy by year